Double Helix Corporation is a non-profit community media organization governed by a 15-member Board of Directors. The corporation is independent of any governmental entity, and is not affiliated with any religious or educational organization.  Double Helix Corporation is the licensee of 88.1 KDHX, the community radio station in St. Louis, Missouri.

Prior to December 31, 2011, when statewide video franchise legislation sunsetted the city's cable franchise ordinance, Double Helix Corporation managed the public and community access television stations for the City of St. Louis.

External links
 Official website

Radio broadcasting companies of the United States